Three Summer Days is a 1997 Serbian drama film directed by Mirjana Vukomanović. The film deals with everyday life of Bosnian Serb refugees living and working in Serbia. The film was selected as the Serbian entry for the Best Foreign Language Film at the 70th Academy Awards, but was not accepted as a nominee.

Cast
 Mirjana Jokovic as Sonja
 Slavko Stimac as Sergije
 Srdjan Todorovic as Nikola
 Milena Dravic as Kaja
 Petar Kralj as Dimitrije
 Mirjana Karanovic as Gazdarica
 Petar Bozovic as Erke

See also
 List of submissions to the 70th Academy Awards for Best Foreign Language Film
 List of Serbian submissions for the Academy Award for Best Foreign Language Film

References

External links
 

1997 films
1997 drama films
Serbian drama films
Serbian-language films
Films set in Serbia
Films set in Belgrade
Films shot in Belgrade